The 1946–47 Iowa State Cyclones men's basketball team represented Iowa State University during the 1946-47 NCAA College men's basketball season. The Cyclones were coached by Louis Menze, who was in his nineteenth and final season with the Cyclones. They played their home games for the first time at the Iowa State Armory in Ames, Iowa.

They finished the season 7–14, 5–5 in Big Six play to finish tied for third place. They also finished in last place in the inaugural Big Six Holiday Tournament.

Roster

Schedule and results 

|-
!colspan=6 style=""|Regular Season

|-

References 

Iowa State Cyclones men's basketball seasons
Iowa State
Iowa State Cyc
Iowa State Cyc